Geraldine Flaharty (March 4, 1936) is a former member of the Kansas House of Representatives, representing the 98th district. She had served from November 21, 1995 to January 14, 2013.

Since 1966, Flaharty has worked as a reading teacher at Oaklawn Elementary School.  She has her BS and ME degrees from Wichita State University.

Flaharty has been involved with a number of community organizations, including the American Association of University Women, International Reading Association, Kansas National Education Association, Sedgwick County Zoo, and Wichita Center for the Arts.

Committee membership
Education
Health and Human Services (Ranking Member)
Aging and Long Term Care
Economic Development and Tourism
Joint Committee on Pensions, Investments and Benefits
Select Committee on KPERS (Ranking Member)

Major donors
The top 5 donors to Flaharty's 2008 campaign:
1. Kansas Realtors Assoc $500 	
2. Southfork Investment $500 	
3. Kansans for Lifesaving Cures $500 	
4. Chesapeake Energy $500 	
5. Kansas National Education Assoc $500

References

External links
Kansas Legislature - Geraldine Flaharty
Project Vote Smart profile
Kansas Votes profile

Democratic Party members of the Kansas House of Representatives
Living people
Women state legislators in Kansas
Wichita State University alumni
Schoolteachers from Kansas
American women educators
20th-century American women politicians
20th-century American politicians
21st-century American women politicians
21st-century American politicians
1936 births